The National Art Gallery of Malaysia is a public art gallery in Kuala Lumpur, Malaysia.

The gallery is situated along Jalan Tun Razak, on the northern edge of central Kuala Lumpur. It is located next to the Istana Budaya, which is Malaysia's main venue for all types of theatre including musical theatre, operetta, classical concert and opera from local and international performances. As of today, this art agency, a statutory body under the Ministry of Tourism Art and Culture is simply known as the "National Art Gallery".

The 'National Art Gallery' was designed by Dato' Ar. Mir Shariman of Arkitek MAA Sdn Bhd, with gallery spaces flanking the circular ramp serve as exhibition areas for more intimate and contemplative viewing. Spiral ramp in the middle provides dynamic visual experience to visitors from different angles at every level.

History
The Arts Council of the Federation of Malaya formed by the then senior civil servant Mubin Sheppard in 1952, had been put to task by the Federal Government 'to encourage and develop a greater knowledge, understanding and practice of the Arts in the Federation of Malaya'. In 1958 the council was asked to name a committee to establish a National Art Gallery . The working Committee functioned for several years until in 1963 that a newly appointed Board of trustees was convened . The first Chairman appointed was Professor Ungku Aziz and the Deputy Chairman was P.G. Lim.

The first exhibition on 28 August 1958, by Tunku Abdul Rahman, the first Prime Minister of Malaysia as the Balai Seni Lukisan Negara or 'National Art Gallery.
The gallery which was established since 1958, had thrived for 25 years in a temporary abode at the Dewan Tunku Abdul Rahman, the country's first House of Parliament on the site known today as the Malaysian Tourism Center .

The Balai changed its name to the National Visual Arts Gallery in 2011 with the establishment of the National Visual Art Development Board Act of 2011 (Act 724) the Akta Lembaga Pembangunan Seni Visual Negara 2011.The Balai is also a statutory body and an agency under the Ministry of Tourism, Art and Culture, of Malaysia.

Transportation
The gallery is accessible via Rapid KL bus route 402.

There is a newly-constructed MRT station - the Kuala Lumpur Hospital station - near the gallery. It is scheduled to open on 16 March 2023.

See also
 List of national galleries
 Malacca Art Gallery

Literature

External links

 Museums of Malaysia | National Art Gallery

1958 establishments in Malaya
Art galleries established in 1958
Art museums and galleries in Kuala Lumpur
Malaysia